Hammon is a city mentioned in the Book of Chronicles. It is related it was within the allotment of Naftali, and given to the Gershonite Levites. William Ewing concluded it is identical with Hammath which appears in the Book of Joshua in a similar context, and probably also with Hammoth-dor. Ewing, Smith's Bible Dictionary and Easton's Bible Dictionary identify it with the present Hamat Tiberias. Eerdmans Bible Dictionary tentatively agrees on the ancient alternative names, and suggest as location either Hamat Tiberias or Tell Raqqat (also Tell al-Qunitria ), north of Tiberias.

References

See also
Hama (disambiguation)

Hebrew Bible cities